The 1926 Michigan Wolverines football team represented the University of Michigan in the 1926 Big Ten Conference football season. In the team's 25th and final season under head coach Fielding H. Yost, Michigan compiled a record of 7–1, outscored its opponents 191 to 38, and tied with Northwestern for the Big Ten Conference championship.  Michigan's only loss was to an undefeated Navy team that was recognized as the national champion by several selectors. At the end of the season, Michigan ranked third in the country under the Dickinson System, trailing only Stanford and Navy.  One selector, Jeff Sagarin, has retroactively named Michigan as a 1926 co-national champion.

Quarterback Benny Friedman and end Bennie Oosterbaan were both selected as consensus All-Americans. Friedman was also Michigan's 1926 team captain and most valuable player.

Schedule

Season summary

Week 1: Oklahoma A&M
On October 2, 1926, Michigan defeated Oklahoma A&M at Ferry Field by a 42–3 score. Bo Molenda scored two touchdown in the first quarter which also featured a blocked kick that resulted in a safety. Led by Benny Friedman, Michigan passed for 160 yards.

Week 2: Michigan State
On October 9, 1926, Michigan defeated Michigan State College by a 55–3 score.

Week 3: Minnesota
Michigan defeated Minnesota by a 20-0 score. Michigan touchdowns were scored by Bo Molenda, George Rich and Louis Gilbert.  Friedman kicked two points after touchdown. Gilbert's touchdown came on a 58-yard run. All 20 points were scored in the first half.

Week 4: Illinois
Michigan defeated Illinois by a 13–0 score. After a scoreless first quarter, Illinois drove to Michigan's 21-yard line. On fourth down, Illinois opted for a forward pass rather than a field goal attempt.  Truskowski intercepted the pass on the 17-yard line. Michigan's first score was set up by a punt that was downed inside the one-yard line.  Illinois was then forced to punt from behind the goal line, and Gilbert returne the ball to Illinois' 30-yard line. After a 14-yard gain on a pass to Gilbert, Michigan was stopped, but Friedman kicked a field goal to give Michigan a 3-0 lead at halftime. After a scoreless third quarter, Michigan scored 10 points in the fourth quarter. Michigan's lone touchdown was scored by Bo Molenda. Molenda's touchdown was set up when Lovett intercepted a pass at the Illinois 37-yard line, and Friedman completed a long pass to Oosterbaan.  Benny Friedman added the point after touchdown and also kicked his second field goal.

Week 5: at Navy
Michigan lost to Navy by a 10-0 score at Baltimore, Maryland. Navy's Howard Caldwell ran for a touchdown against the Wolverines.  Caldwell's touchdown was the first scored against Michigan since the 1924 season. After the game, the Navy midshipmen stormed the field, tore down the goalposts and broke them into splinters to be kept as souvenirs.  The game was played before approximately 50,000 spectators. The 1926 Navy Midshipmen football team went on to complete an undefeated season and was recognized as the national champion by several selectors.

Week 6: Wisconsin
Michigan defeated Wisconsin by a 37-0 score. Michigan completed 9 of 15 passes for 147 yards. Wisconsin completed only 4 of 20 passes for 36 yards.  Friedman threw for a touchdown to Oosterbaan and also caught a touchdown pass from Gilbert. Wally Weber scored two touchdowns, and Friedman, Oosterbaan and Hoffman registered one touchdown each. Friedman kicked for a field goal and four points after touchdown. The margin of victory was the largest in the history of the Michigan-Wisconsin rivalry.

Week 7: at Ohio State
Michigan defeated Ohio State by a 17–16 score.  The crowd of 90,000 at Columbus, Ohio, was reported to be "the greatest crowd that ever paid to see a football game."  Ohio State jumped out to an early 10-0 lead.  Michigan responded with its own touchdown and field goal to tie the score at 10-10. At the end of the third quarter, Marek of Ohio State was unable to field a punt at his own six-yard line.  As Marek had touched the ball, Michigan took possession when it fell on the loose ball. At the start of the fourth quarter, Friedman then threw a touchdown pass and converted the PAT. Ohio State drove down the field for a touchdown, but the PAT attempt by Myers Clark failed.

Week 8: at Minnesota
On November 20, 1926, Michigan defeated Minnesota by a 7-6 score at Memorial Stadium in Minneapolis. The game was the last for Michigan under head coach Yost. Herb Joesting scored on a short run in the second quarter, but Peplaw missed the attempted at extra point. Michigan trailed 6-0 in the fourth quarter when Nydahl of Minnesota fumbled.  Oosterbaan picked up the loose ball and ran 58 yards for a touchdown. Friedman drop-kicked the extra point.

Players

Varsity letter winners
The following players won varsity letters for their work on the 1926 football team:
Ray Baer, Louisville, Kentucky – started 6 games at left tackle
Richard Sidney "Syd" Dewey, Monroe, Michigan – started 6 games at left guard, 1 game at right guard
Victor E. Domhoff – quarterback
William R. Flora, Muskegon, Michigan – started 7 games at right end
Benny Friedman, Cleveland, Ohio – started 7 games at quarterback
Norman Gabel, Detroit, Michigan – started 6 games at right tackle
Louis Gilbert, Kalamazoo, Michigan – started 5 games at left halfback
Harold T. Greenwald, Chicago, Illinois – started 1 game at right halfback
Henry S. Grinnell – tackle
William H. Heath – tackle
LeRoy G. Heston – end
Leo W. Hoffman – halfback
John H. Lovette, Saginaw, Michigan – started 5 games at right guard
Kent C. McIntyre – guard
James F. Miller, Jr., Adrian, Michigan – started 2 games at left halfback
John J. Molenda, Detroit, Michigan – started 4 games at fullback, 3 games at right halfback
Herman Z. Nyland, Jr. – end
Bennie Oosterbaan, Muskegon, Michigan – started 7 games at left end
John M. Palmeroli, Highland Park, Michigan – started 1 game at left guard
William H. Puckelwartz – quarterback
George E. Rich, Lakewood, Ohio – started 3 games at right halfback
John B. Schoenfeld, Bartlesville, Oklahoma – started 2 games at center
George G. Squires (or Squier), South Haven, Michigan – started 1 game at right guard, 1 game at right tackle
Joseph R. Truskowski, Detroit, Michigan – started 5 games at center
Wally Weber, Mt. Clemens, Michigan – started 3 games at fullback

aMa letter winners
The following players won aMa letters for their work on the 1926 football team:
Dudley G. Black – fullback
Frank A. Harrigan – halfback
Maxwell E. Nickerson – tackle
Marshall Boden – end
Frank E. Meese – tackle
Otto Pommerening, Ann Arbor, Michigan – started 1 game at left tackle
Raymond A. Cragin – center
George A. Nicholson, Jr. – center

Awards and honors
All-Americans: Benny Friedman (consensus), Bennie Oosterbaan (consensus)
All-Conference: Bennie Oosterbaan (AP-1), Benny Friedman (AP-1), William Flora (AP-2), Ray Baer (AP-2), John Lovette (AP-2)
Most Valuable Player: Benny Friedman
Meyer Morton Award: George Rich

Coaching staff
Head coach: Fielding H. Yost
Assistant coaches: Jack Blott, Harvey Emery, Ray Fisher, Judson Hyames, Cliff Keen, Harry Kipke, William Louisell, Edwin Mather, George F. Veenker, Tad Wieman
Trainer: Charles B. Hoyt
Manager: John S. Denton, James V. Hughey (assistant), Ray C. Humphrey (assistant), Leonard A. Spooner (assistant), Frank L. Wachter (assistant)

References

External links
 1926 Football Team -- Bentley Historical Library, University of Michigan Athletics History

Michigan
Michigan Wolverines football seasons
Big Ten Conference football champion seasons
Michigan Wolverines football